Mr. Broadway is an American 13-episode CBS adventure and drama television series starring Craig Stevens as New York City public relations specialist Mike Bell. It ran from September 20, 1964 until December 26, 1964.

Premise and cast
Stevens portrayed Mike Bell, whose Michael Bell Associates public-relations firm created and maintained for actors, politicians, and other high-profile people. Producer David Susskind described Bell as "a dynamic bman of a thousand facets". Bell's assistant was former newspaperman Hank McClure, portrayed by Horace McMahon. Lani Miyazaki played Bell's girl Friday.

Production
Playwright Garson Kanin wrote the script for the pilot episode of Mr. Broadway, and by September 1963, he had created synopses for 22 episodes. He was also a part-owner of the series. He based much of the content on elements of short stories that he had written.

Susskind and Daniel Melnick of Talent Associates-Paramount produced Mr. Broadway. Dave Brubeck composed musical scores for the episodes.

Kanin's involvement diminished after he wrote the first episode. He directed another episode, but his name did not appear among the screen credits thereafter. CBS ended production of the show after 13 episodes had been completed. It concluded with the December 26, 1964, broadcast. A representatives of CBS said that filming of two more episodes was proposed, but Stevens rejected the idea.

Mr. Broadway was filmed at the Biograph studio in the Bronx. Locations used in filming included El Morroco, The Forum, the Four Seasons, the Rainbow Room, The Tavern on the Green, and The Tower Suites.

Sponsors included Procter & Gamble, Brown & Williamson, Lipton, Alberto-Culver, and Pontiac.

Mr. Broadway was one of a group of CBS Films series sold to Austarama for broadcast in Australia.

Episodes

References

CBS original programming
1964 American television series debuts
1964 American television series endings
1960s American drama television series
Black-and-white American television shows
Television shows set in New York City
Television series by CBS Studios
Television series by Warner Bros. Television Studios
English-language television shows
Television series by Talent Associates